James Hemenway was a legislator from Cottage Grove in the U.S. state of Oregon, first elected in Lane County in June 1900.

References

Oregon Republicans
1900 Oregon elections
Year of birth missing
Year of death missing
People from Cottage Grove, Oregon